Kieran Kyle Culkin (born September 30, 1982) is an American actor. The brother of actors Macaulay and Rory, he began his career as a child actor in the films Home Alone (1990), Father of the Bride (1991), The Mighty (1998), and The Cider House Rules (1999). He achieved a career breakthrough after starring in the film Igby Goes Down (2002), for which he was nominated for his first Golden Globe Award, as well as winning a Critics' Choice Movie Award and a Satellite Award. He later appeared in the films Scott Pilgrim vs. the World (2010), Margaret (2011), Wiener-Dog (2016), and No Sudden Move (2021).

Since 2018, Culkin has starred as Roman Roy in the HBO television series Succession, for which he won a Critics' Choice Television Award in 2022, was nominated for a Primetime Emmy Award in 2020 and 2022, and three Golden Globe Awards in 2019, 2020 and 2022.

Early life
Kieran Kyle Culkin was born on September 30, 1982, in New York City to Christopher Cornelius "Kit" Culkin, a former Broadway stage actor, and Patricia Brentrup, a native of North Dakota who met Kit in 1974 while working as a road traffic controller in Sundance, Wyoming. The couple relocated to Kit's native New York City, and gave birth to a total of seven children: Culkin's siblings include Shane ( 1976), Dakota (1979–2008), Macaulay ( 1980), Quinn ( 1984), Christian ( 1987), and Rory ( 1989). He also had a paternal half-sister, Jennifer (born 1970), who died in 2000. Culkin's paternal aunt is actress Bonnie Bedelia.

He spent his early life in the Yorkville neighborhood of Manhattan, where he resided with his parents and siblings. In his early childhood, the family struggled financially; his mother worked as a telephone operator, while his father served as a sacristan at a local Catholic church. In September 1995, Culkin's parents separated, and he has been estranged from his father ever since.

Career
Culkin's first film role was a small part alongside his brother Macaulay in Home Alone, as cousin Fuller McCallister. He continued acting as a child and teenager, mainly working in comedies, including Home Alone 2: Lost in New York, Father of the Bride, and its sequel, Father of the Bride Part II.

As a teenager, he alternated between lead roles in independent films and small parts in mainstream films. He appeared in the Academy Award-nominated movie Music of the Heart, played the title role in the film Igby Goes Down, for which he was nominated for a Golden Globe Award, and played the lead role in The Mighty as Kevin Dillon.

He is one of the ensemble main cast members in the HBO series Succession. In 2018, 2020, and 2021, he was nominated for a Golden Globe Award for Best Supporting Actor - Series, Miniseries or Television Film for his role as Roman Roy on the show.

Personal life 
Culkin married Jazz Charton on June 8, 2013. They have two children together, a daughter born September 2019 and a son born August 2021.

Filmography

Film

Television

Stage

References

External links

 
 
 

1982 births
Living people
20th-century American male actors
21st-century American male actors
Audiobook narrators
American male child actors
American male film actors
American male stage actors
American male television actors
Male actors from New York City
Obie Award recipients